Beeran Gali (also known as Biran Gali or Baran Gali) is a Union Council of Abbottabad District, in Khyber-Pakhtunkhwa province of Pakistan. located approximately 20 km from Abbottabad city.

History 

This area was historically known as Baad Burhan, and is mentioned by Al Biruni in his book Ta'rikh al-Hind, The Chronicles of India, from 1030. Al Biruni describes Baad Burhan as a beautiful area. This area is ruled by sardar obaid.

Topography
The area is situated between two mountains, Thandiani and Miranjani. It is located at 34°11'40N 73°21'50E and has an average elevation of 2176 metres (7142 feet) above sea-level.

Subdivisions
The Union Council is subdivided into the following areas:
Andarseri, Beerangali and Jhafar.

Demographics 
Its population numbers about 12,300. Ethnically, main tribe is the Karlal  
the Quresh and Gujar are also living in Ander Sari and Okhreela Village of UC. Beerangali. According to local lore, the inhabitants of this area are particularly courageous. According to the author of Hazra Gazetteers, the people of this area had not accepted the British rule, and were found to be most resistant until 1947.
There are two high schools, one each for boys and girls as well as numerous middle and primary schools.

References

Union councils of Abbottabad District
Galyat of Pakistan